Randolph station is an Amtrak train station in Randolph, Vermont, United States. The only train that serves the station is the Vermonter, which operates between St. Albans, Vermont and Washington, D.C. The station also contains a local restaurant. On the other side of the tracks is the depot for a private bus company, Randolph Stagecoach Transportation, essentially creating an unofficial intermodal transportation center. However, the schedules of the two systems are not aligned in any way.

History

The Vermont Central Railroad was chartered to build a line along the Connecticut River to Lake Champlain, which was to include service to Randolph. The original station was not built until 1848, by which time the VCRR was acquired by the Central Vermont Railway. By the late-1870s (although signs on the depot suggest 1881), Central Vermont moved the original depot and built a new one, converting the VCRR station into a freight house. When Central Vermont was on the verge of bankruptcy in 1896, the Grand Trunk Western Railroad, a subsidiary of Canadian National Railway bought the railroad and the station out and kept it afloat throughout most of the 20th Century.

Both passenger and freight service ended in Randolph in 1966. A group of volunteers later restored the stations and the surrounding area, including converting the second station into a café and restaurant.

Randolph Station became a contributing property to the Depot Square Historic District since 1975. In the 1990s local leaders began lobbying Amtrak to make Randolph a new railroad stop, even going so far as to rebuild the original VCRR freight depot into a bus depot for Randolph Stagecoach Transportation. Amtrak began using the station as a stop on the Vermonter in 1996.

References

External links

Amtrak stations in Vermont
Buildings and structures in Randolph, Vermont
Restaurants in Vermont
Transportation buildings and structures in Orange County, Vermont
Former Central Vermont Railway stations
Greek Revival architecture in Vermont
Victorian architecture in Vermont

Historic district contributing properties in Vermont
Railway stations on the National Register of Historic Places in Vermont
National Register of Historic Places in Orange County, Vermont
1849 establishments in Vermont
Railway stations in the United States opened in 1849